Physisporinus is a genus of fungi in the family Meripilaceae. The genus was circumscribed by Finish mycologist Petter Karsten in 1889.

References

Meripilaceae
Taxa named by Petter Adolf Karsten
Polyporales genera
Taxa described in 1889